Eduardo Abraham Leines Barrera (born 16 March 1956) is a Mexican politician from the Institutional Revolutionary Party. From 2000 to 2003 he served as Deputy of the LVIII Legislature of the Mexican Congress representing Veracruz, and previously served as municipal president of Huayacocotla.

References

1956 births
Living people
Politicians from Veracruz
Institutional Revolutionary Party politicians
20th-century Mexican politicians
21st-century Mexican politicians
Deputies of the LVIII Legislature of Mexico
Members of the Chamber of Deputies (Mexico) for Veracruz
Municipal presidents in Veracruz
National Autonomous University of Mexico alumni